Joseph S. Chapman (born Bristol, United Kingdom, 22 July 1990) is a squash player who represents the British Virgin Islands in regional Games as well as at the CAC Games and Commonwealth Games Melbourne 2006, Delhi 2010, Glasgow 2014 and Gold Coast 2018. In Melbourne 2006 he became the youngest player to compete in squash. In Delhi 2010 he was the nation's flag-bearer. In Gold Coast he won the plate competition by beating Cayman Islands Cameron Stafford in the finals.

Chapman is the son of Mark and Heather Chapman. He attended The University of Rochester studying Economics and completed in NCAA Division 1 squash for the Yellowjackets.

Chapman has been the No. 1 ranked player in the BVI since 2006.

At Delhi 2010 he faced world #16 Cameron Pilley in the first round and lost 5-11, 9-11, 0-11.

Hurricane Irma
Chapman has talked about the transformative experience of Hurricane Irma on his worldview, stating in an interview with Guy Spier, " "incredibly devastating to have your properties damaged..but not only that, the country was destroyed."

References

Sources
 Preview
 Virgin Islands News Online
 Squash

External links
 Commonwealth games
 Four Set To Share Commonwealth Games Squash Gold
 Championships
 Tortola Sports Club - Road Town, Tortola
 Podcast Episode with Guy Spier

1990 births
Living people
University of Rochester alumni
Squash players at the 2006 Commonwealth Games
Squash players at the 2010 Commonwealth Games
Commonwealth Games competitors for the British Virgin Islands
British Virgin Islands squash players
Sportspeople from Bristol
Squash players at the 2015 Pan American Games
Squash players at the 2018 Commonwealth Games
Competitors at the 2009 World Games
Competitors at the 2017 World Games
Pan American Games competitors for the British Virgin Islands